is a Japanese voice actress and singer. She is an actress, known for Charger Girl Ju-den Chan (2009), Hime-sama Goyojin (2006) and Magician's Academy! (2008).

Biography

Filmography

Anime
Ar tonelico as Aurica Nestmile
Chaos;Head as Nanami Nishijō
Da Capo Second Season as Aisia
Da Capo III as Charles Yoshino
Fight Ippatsu! Jūden-chan!! as Hakone OumiGift ~eternal rainbow~ as Kirino KonosakaHimesama Goyōjin as Na-naIzumo: Takeki Tsurugi no Senki as SuzakuKamichama Karin as KazusaMagical Kanan as Emi KojimaMacademi Wasshoi! as Suzuho HasegawaNight Wizard The ANIMATION as Elis ShihōRay as Aka RibbonStrawberry Panic! as Remon NatsumeSumomomo Momomo as Iroha MiyamotoMaster of Epic: The Animation Age as Waragetcha Black

Video gamesAr tonelico as Aurica Nestmile, Hama, MirAr tonelico II as Jakuri, Aurica NestmileAtelier Rorona: The Alchemist of Arland as Hom (Female)Chaos;Head as Nanami NishijōChaos;Head Love Chu Chu! as Nanami NishijōCross Edge as Aurica NestmileMana Khemia: Alchemists of Al-Revis as Anna LemouriMana Khemia 2: Fall of Alchemy as Puni-YoMemories Off 6: T-wave as Yuno KasugaL@ve once as Nagomi TachibanaSdorica as Yamitsuki, Yamitsuki SP, Yamitsuki MZ

Music
Kurenai (Night Wizard! Opening)
Happy Succession
PHOSPHOR (Kanokon Opening)
Mamorasete... (Master of Epic: The Animation Age Ending)
Kizuna no Uta (Tayutama: Kiss on my Deity Ending)
Kirenai Knife (Remember 11: The Age of Infinity'' Ending)

References

External links
 Official blog 
 Official agency profile 
 Ui Miyazaki at GamePlaza-Haruka Voice Acting Database 
 Ui Miyazaki at Hitoshi Doi's Seiyuu Database
 

Living people
Anime musicians
Japanese video game actresses
Japanese voice actresses
Singers from Tokyo
Voice actresses from Tokyo
81 Produce voice actors
21st-century Japanese singers
21st-century Japanese women singers
1981 births